The Shop Around the Corner is a 1940 American romantic comedy-drama film produced and directed by Ernst Lubitsch and starring Margaret Sullavan, James Stewart and Frank Morgan. The supporting cast included Joseph Schildkraut, Sara Haden, Felix Bressart, and William Tracy. It is widely regarded as perhaps the finest romantic comedy in American cinema and has served as a model to which all subsequent romcoms are to some extent indebted. The wit and deftness of Lubitch’s direction, a pitch-perfect screenplay and impeccable performances by its seasoned cast all combine to create a work that is moving, funny and heartwarming.
The screenplay was written by Samson Raphaelson based on the 1937 Hungarian play Parfumerie by Miklós László. Eschewing regional politics in the years leading up to World War II, the film is about two employees at a leathergoods shop in Budapest who can barely stand each other, not realizing they are falling in love as anonymous correspondents through their letters, a plot concept revived in the 1998 film You've Got Mail starring Tom Hanks and Meg Ryan.

The Shop Around the Corner is ranked #28 on AFI's 100 Years... 100 Passions, and is listed in Times All-Time 100 Movies. In 1999, the film was selected for preservation in the United States National Film Registry by the Library of Congress as being "culturally, historically, or aesthetically significant".

Plot 

Alfred Kralik (James Stewart) is the top salesman at a leathergoods shop in Budapest owned by the high-strung Mr. Hugo Matuschek (Frank Morgan). Kralik's coworkers at Matuschek and Company include his friend, Pirovitch (Felix Bressart), a kindly family man; Ferencz Vadas (Joseph Schildkraut), a two-faced womanizer; saleswoman Ilona Novotny (Inez Courtney); clerk Flora Kaczek (Sara Haden); and Pepi Katona (William Tracy), an ambitious, precocious delivery boy. One morning, Kralik reveals to Pirovitch that he's been corresponding anonymously with an intelligent and cultured woman whose ad he came across in the newspaper.

Kralik is Mr. Matuschek's oldest and most trusted employee, but lately there has been tension between the two. They get into an argument over Mr. Matuschek's idea to sell a cigarette box that plays "Ochi Chërnye" when opened. After their exchange, Klara Novak (Margaret Sullavan) enters the gift shop looking for a job. Kralik tells her there are no openings, but when she is able to sell one of the cigarette boxes (as a candy box), Mr. Matuschek hires her. However, she and Kralik do not get along.

Mr. Matuschek begins to suspect his wife is having an affair as she stays out late and requests money from him.

As Christmas approaches, Kralik is preparing to meet his mystery correspondent for a dinner date. The meeting is stalled when Mr. Matuschek demands that everyone stay after work to decorate the shop. Later Kralik is called into Mr. Matuschek's office and is fired. No one in the shop understands Mr. Matuschek's actions are related to his suspicions that Kralik is having an affair with his wife. Later, Mr. Matuschek meets with a private investigator who informs him that his wife is having an affair with one of his employees—Ferencz Vadas. Pepi returns to the shop just in time to prevent Mr. Matuschek from committing suicide.

Meanwhile, Kralik arrives at the Cafe Nizza, where he discovers that his mystery woman is Novak. Despite his disappointment, Kralik goes in and talks with her, pretending he is there to meet Pirovitch. In his mind, Kralik tries to reconcile the cultured woman of his letters with his annoying coworker—secretly hoping that things might work out with her. Concerned that Kralik's presence will spoil her first meeting with her "far superior" mystery correspondent, she calls Kralik a "little insignificant clerk" and asks him to leave.

Later that night, Kralik goes to the hospital to visit Mr. Matuschek, who offers him a job as manager of Matuschek and Company. Grateful to Pepi for saving his life, Mr. Matuschek promotes him to clerk. The next day, Novak calls in sick after her mystery man failed to show. That night, Kralik visits her at her apartment. During his visit, she receives a letter from her correspondent and reads it in front of Kralik (who wrote the letter).

Two weeks later, on Christmas Eve, Matuschek and Company achieves record sales. Kralik and Miss Novak, alone in the shop, talk about their planned dates for the evening and Miss Novak reveals that she had a crush on Kralik when they first met. After pretending to have met Novak's mystery man, Kralik puts a red carnation in his lapel and reveals to her that he is her mystery correspondent and they kiss.

Cast

Reception

The Shop Around the Corner has a 99% rating on Rotten Tomatoes based on 93 reviews, with a weighted average of 8.8/10. The critical consensus states: "Deftly directed by Ernst Lubitsch from a smart, funny script by Samson Raphaelson, The Shop Around the Corner is a romantic comedy in the finest sense of the term." Dave Kehr argued Lubitsch makes "brilliant deployment of point of view, allowing the audience to enter the perceptions of each character at exactly the right moment to develop maximum sympathy and suspense." It ranked 202nd in the British Film Institute's 2012 Sight & Sound critics' poll of the greatest films ever made, having garnered eight critics' votes. The work was also 58th in BBC's 2015 poll of the best American films.

Film historian David Thomson wrote:

Adaptations
The Shop Around the Corner was dramatized in two half-hour broadcasts of The Screen Guild Theater, first on September 29, 1940, with Margaret Sullavan and James Stewart, second on February 26, 1945, with Van Johnson and Phyllis Thaxter. It was also dramatized as a one-hour program on Lux Radio Theaters June 23, 1941 broadcast with Claudette Colbert and Don Ameche.

Remakes
The film spawned a musical remake, In the Good Old Summertime (1949), which stars Judy Garland and Van Johnson.

The 1963 Broadway musical She Loves Me was also inspired by the play and the film.

The film You've Got Mail (1998), with Tom Hanks and Meg Ryan, revolves around two people who dislike each other while developing an anonymous romance by email correspondence. The film uses plot elements and dialogue lines similar to the 1940 film, especially during the first date. Screen credit of You've Got Mail is given to Miklós László for Parfumerie (the play on which the 1940 film is based), but in a nod to the earlier film, one of the protagonists of You've Got Mail owns a bookstore named "The Shop Around the Corner".

The 1996 Indian Tamil-language romance film Kadhal Kottai directed by Agathiyan is an unofficial remake of The Shop Around the Corner.

See also
 List of Christmas films

References
Notes

Citations

External links

The Shop Around the Corner essay by Kevin Bahr at National Film Registry

 
 
 
 
 
 "Acting Ordinary in The Shop Around the Corner" Movie: A Journal of Film Criticism, Issue 1, 2010
 "The Shop Around the Corner" essay by Daniel Eagan in America's Film Legacy: The Authoritative Guide to the Landmark Movies in the National Film Registry, A&C Black, 2010 , pages 307-308
Streaming audio
 The Shop Around the Corner on Screen Guild Theater: September 29, 1940
 The Shop Around the Corner on Lux Radio Theater: June 23, 1941

1940 films
1940 romantic comedy films
American Christmas films
American black-and-white films
Fictional shops
American films based on plays
Films based on works by Miklós László
Films directed by Ernst Lubitsch
Films set in Hungary
Films set in Budapest
Metro-Goldwyn-Mayer films
United States National Film Registry films
Films with screenplays by Samson Raphaelson
Articles containing video clips
1940s Christmas films
American romantic comedy films
Workplace comedy films
1940s English-language films
1940s American films